Narahari Sarkar was a 16th-century Bengali poet, lyrist, a Vaishnava Bhakti saint, and one of the associates and disciples of Chaitanya Mahaprabhu. He is best known for his Sanskrit works, Bhakti-candrika-patala, Bhaktamrtastaka, Krsna Bhajanamrta, etc. He was the preacher of the doctrine of ''Gaurangarvada".

Life and works 
Narahari Sarkar was born into a Hindu Baidya family in Bengal. He was born on Saka 1400 (=1478 / 1481 CE) at Srikhanda in the Bardhaman district of Bengal. His father was Narayanadeva Sarkar, and his elder brother Mukunda was a physician to the Pathan King at Gour. Narahari also served as court physician of the Sultan of Gour for some time. Narahari, Mukunda and his nephew Raghunanda (son of Mukunda), were associates of Chaitanya Mahaprabhu.

Narahari initially wrote pada (verses) on Krishna but, after the influence of Chaitanya, he started composing verses dedicated to the latter. He propounded a Chaitanya–centric Vaishnava faith, called as 'Gaurangarvad'. According to Sen, Narahari was perhaps the first poet to compose verses about the life of Chaitanya. He used simple and direct language in composing verses. He was a recognised Sanskrit scholar. He wrote several books, including Bhakti-chandrika-patala, Krishna-bhajanamrita, Bhaktamrtastaka, Saparsad-Gourangavandana, etc. He wrote only stray lyrics, incorporating the thoughts of 'Nagarabhava' believes.

Lochana Dasa, composer of Chaitanya Mangala, was a disciple of Narahari Sarkar. He died in 1582 CE.

Notes

Sources 

16th-century Hindu philosophers and theologians
16th-century Bengali poets
Bhakti movement
Devotees of Krishna
Gaudiya religious leaders
16th-century Hindu religious leaders
Hindu ascetics
Hindu mystics
Hindu revivalists
Indian Hindu monks
Indian Vaishnavites
Vaishnava saints
Scholars from West Bengal
Bengali Hindu saints
15th-century births
1582 deaths
Year of birth uncertain